The Thessaly Football Clubs Association (TFCA) (Ένωση Ποδοσφαιρικών Σωματείων Θεσσαλίας, ΕΠΣΘ = Enosi Podosfairikon/Podosferikon Somateion/Somation Thessalias/Thesalias, EPSTh) is a football (soccer) organization in the Magnesia prefecture that is part of the Greek Football Federation. The champions of the TFCA are promoted to the Gamma Ethniki, while the cup winner of CA play in the Greek Cup.

History

Thessaly FCA was founded in 1929 with its headquarters in Volos and the main power took part in soccer clubs throughout Thessaly.  Later on, it founded separate association for three other prefectures: Larissa, Trikala and Karditsa. During the decaded of 1960s and early 1970s those sub-associations broke away and formed their own.
The TCA has around 50 clubs divided into three divisions, but also supervises junior, youth and women's championships in Magnesia. It is one of the oldest local federations in Greece, thus it kept its original name despite the fact that it only covers football in the Magnesia area and not in the whole region of Thessaly.

Champions

Divisions

The 2008-09 season, the TFCA championships includes the clubs of each division:

First Division

The first division features 18 clubs.  The winner enters the Fourth Division.  Two or three teams with the lowest points relegates to the second division.  Relegated club from the Fourth Division returns to the prefectural first division.

 Dimini AU
 Aias Sourpi
 Akropoli
 Apollon Kanali
 Aris Melissatika
 Asteras
 Almyros
 Magnesia
 Doxa Aerinos
 Kentavros
 Lechonio Union
 Magnissiakos
 Nei Athlites Nikis
 Orminio
 Panionios Nea Ionia
 Protessilaos
 Sarakinos Volos
 Skiathos

Second Division

This division features 18 clubs.  The winner and the second place runner-up enters the first division.  Two or three teams ending up in the last place relegates to the third division.

 Agia Paraskevi
 Agrotikos
 Aetos
 Anthimos Gazi
 Athlitiki Enossi 2002
 Chloi
 Diagoras
 Dimitra
 Dionyssos
 Ermis
 Ethnikos
 Iasonas
 Iolkos
 Iraklis Agioi Theodoroi
 Makrinitsa
 Mikrothives
 Myrmidones

Third division

This division contains 12 clubs.  The winner and the runner-up enters the second division.

 Aias Tr.
 Aris Anthi
 Iraklis Volos
 Kentavros Argalasti
 Kentavros Zagora
 Kissos
 Magnesia GAU
 Pagassitikos
 Pileas
 Sipiados GAU
 Skopelos
 Toxotis Volos

Other teams
The teams that were in the higher division that were not included in the 2008-09 season are listed here:
Thiseas Agria

Teams in national divisions

Seven teams participate in national divisions in the 2022–23 season :
Super League 1:
Volos NFC
Super League 2:
Niki Volos
Gamma Ethniki:
Theseus Agria
Olympiacos Volos
Diagoras Stefanonikeio
Dimitra Efxeinoupolis
Second Women's Division:
Volos AC 2004
Magnisiakos

External links
 Official website 

Magnesia (regional unit)
Association football governing bodies in Greece